The public holidays in Madagascar are:

References

Malagasy culture
Society of Madagascar
Madagascar
Madagascar